Tumar Darrahsi-ye Sofla (also Romanized as Ţūmār Darrahsī-ye Soflá; also known as Tūmār Darrehsī-ye Pā'īn) is a village in Arshaq-e Gharbi Rural District, Moradlu District, Meshgin Shahr County, Ardabil Province, Iran. At the 2006 census, its population was 54, in 10 families.

References 

Towns and villages in Meshgin Shahr County